Minnedosa may refer to:

 Minnedosa, Manitoba, a community in Manitoba, Canada
 Minnedosa (electoral district), a political riding in the same area
 Minnedosa (schooner barge), a Great Lakes grain barge that sank in 1905
 SS Minnedosa, 1918 passenger ship for Canadian Pacific Railways